= Do it for Denmark =

Danish media and advertising campaign designed to increase birth rates

Do it for Denmark is a Danish media and advertising campaign designed to increase the birth rate of the nation. The campaign, launched by the Danish travel agency Spies Rejser, is a tongue-in-cheek attempt to lure Danes to book holidays as a way to stop a purported population decline in Denmark. It also attracted wide attention in English-speaking countries as well. Despite the advertisements' obvious irony, it did in fact result in an increase of the Danish birth rate.

A British publication, the Policy Press, associated with the University of Bristol, has criticized the campaign for "invoking age-related and gendered stereotypes". The "Do it for Denmark", and subsequent "Do it for Mom" ads have been accused by this publication of carrying "explicit heteronormative and ageist tones" that "reflect a pro-natal and youth-oriented culture."
